The final and the qualifying heats of the women's 4×100 metre medley relay event at the 1998 World Aquatics Championships were held on Friday 16 January 1998 in Perth, Western Australia.

Final

Qualifying heats

Heat 1

Heat 2

See also
1996 Women's Olympic Games 4x100m Medley (Atlanta)
1997 Women's World Championships (SC) 4x100m Medley (Gothenburg)
1997 Women's European Championships (LC) 4x100m Medley (Seville)
2000 Women's Olympic Games 4x100m Medley (Sydney)

References

Swimming at the 1998 World Aquatics Championships
1998 in women's swimming